The Right to Romance  is a 1933 American pre-Code drama film starring Ann Harding and Robert Young and released by RKO Radio Pictures.

Premise
Ann Harding plays a successful plastic surgeon who meets a local playboy, played by Robert Young, and impulsively marries him.

Cast

Preservation status
This is one of the "lost RKO films" owned by Merian C. Cooper and only re-released in April 2007 when Turner Classic Movies acquired the rights and showed all six films on TCM.

Cooper accused RKO of not paying him all the money contractually due for the films he produced in the 1930s. A settlement was reached in 1946, giving Cooper complete ownership of six RKO titles: 
Rafter Romance  (1933) with Ginger Rogers
Double Harness (1933) with Ann Harding and William Powell
The Right to Romance (1933)
One Man's Journey (1933) with Lionel Barrymore
Living on Love (1937)
A Man to Remember (1938)

According to an interview with a retired RKO executive, shown as a promo on TCM, Cooper withdrew the films, only allowing them to be shown on television in 1955–1956 in New York City.

In 2006, Turner Classic Movies, which had acquired the rights to the six films after extensive legal negotiations, broadcast them on TCM in April 2007, their first full public exhibition in over 70 years. TCM, in association with the Library of Congress and the Brigham Young University Motion Picture Archive, had searched many film archives throughout the world to find copies of the films in order to create new 35mm prints.

References

External links
 
 
 

1933 films
RKO Pictures films
Films directed by Alfred Santell
American drama films
Films with screenplays by Sidney Buchman
American black-and-white films
1933 drama films
1930s American films